Shane McCormack is a Gaelic footballer for Kildare. He plays his club football for Allenwood.

References

Living people
Allenwood Gaelic footballers
Gaelic football goalkeepers
Kildare inter-county Gaelic footballers
1985 births